Longipterygidae is a family of early enantiornithean avialans from the Early Cretaceous epoch of China. All known specimens come from the Jiufotang Formation and Yixian Formation, dating to the early Aptian age, 125-120 million years ago.

Description

Longipterygids are characterized by an extremely long, toothed snout (making up over 60% of the total skull length), in which the teeth are restricted to the tips of the jaws. The snouts were straight but slightly concave at a point behind the nostrils, and the bones of the snout tip were solid. Their pygostyles, the series of fused vertebrae in the tail, were unusually large, and longer than the foot bones. The feet of longipterygids were also specialized relative to other enantiornitheans. Where most enantiornitheans had a long middle toe with a "knuckle" (trochlea) that extended beyond the outer two, the toes of longipterygids were even in length, and attached to the rest of the foot at the same level. This configuration is also seen in some groups of modern birds and is usually considered an adaptation for advanced perching ability. It is likely that longipterygids lived primarily in trees. Because their long jaws tipped with large, often curved teeth are usually considered an adaptation for catching and eating fish, it is likely that they were similar in ecology to modern kingfishers. Other interpretations of their habitus include mud-probing and the probing for insects behind tree bark. A study on Mesozoic avialan diets does recover Longipteryx as a piscivore. A 2022 study, however, does find them most likely to be generalistic insectivores (sans possibly Shengjingornis due to its larger size, poorly preserved skull and unusual pedal anatomy), being too small for specialised carnivory and herbivory; the atypical rostrum is tentatively speculated to be unrelated to feeding ecology.

Classification
The Longipterygidae was first coined as a family of enantiornitheans by Zhang and colleagues in 2001. They included only the first known species, Longipteryx chaoyangensis, and placed the family in its own order, Longipterygiformes. While Longipterygiformes has never been formally defined, Longipterygidae was given a phylogenetic definition by O'Connor and colleagues in 2009. They defined the clade to include Longipteryx, Longisrostravis, their most recent common ancestor, and all of its descendants.

The cladogram below was found in the phylogenetic analysis of O'Connor, Gao and Chiappe (2010a).

Subsequently, the following cladogram was found in the phylogenetic analysis of Li et al. (2012):

References 

 
Early Cretaceous dinosaurs of Asia
Cretaceous China
Prehistoric dinosaur families
Aptian first appearances
Aptian extinctions